Muhammad Kazim Ali Pirzada is a Pakistani politician who was a Member of the Provincial Assembly of the Punjab, from 2008 to May 2018 and August 2018 to January 2023.

Early life and education
He was born on 25 December 1973 in Bahawalpur.

He received his early education in 1992 from Aitchison College. He has the degree of Bachelor of Commerce which he obtained in 1995 from Punjab College of Commerce.

Political career
He was elected to the Provincial Assembly of the Punjab as an independent candidate from Constituency PP-273 (Bahawalpur-VII) in 2008 Pakistani general election. He received 34,680 votes and defeated a candidate of Pakistan Muslim League (Q).

He was re-elected to the Provincial Assembly of the Punjab as a candidate of Pakistan Muslim League (N) (PML-N) from Constituency PP-273 (Bahawalpur-VII) in 2013 Pakistani general election.

He was re-elected to Provincial Assembly of the Punjab as a candidate of PML-N from Constituency PP-247 (Bahawalpur-III) in 2018 Pakistani general election.

References

Living people
Punjab MPAs 2013–2018
Punjab MPAs 2008–2013
1973 births
Pakistan Muslim League (N) MPAs (Punjab)
Punjab MPAs 2018–2023
Aitchison College alumni